KUKA 105.9 FM is a radio station licensed to Driscoll, Texas. The station broadcasts a country music format and is owned by Claro Communications, Ltd.

References

External links
KUKA's official website

UKA
Country radio stations in the United States